Russell Crow may refer to:

 Russell Crowe, actor, film producer and musician
 Russell Crow (footballer), Australian rules footballer